The 2022–23 Minnesota Golden Gophers men's ice hockey season is the 102nd season of play for the program. They represent the University of Minnesota in the 2022–23 NCAA Division I men's ice hockey season. This season marks the 33rd in the Big Ten Conference. The Golden Gophers are coached by Bob Motzko, in his fifth season, and play their home games at 3M Arena at Mariucci

Season

Departures

Recruiting

Roster
As of August 19, 2022.

Standings

Schedule and results

|-
!colspan=12 style=";" | Regular Season

|-
!colspan=12 style=";" | 

|-
!colspan=12 style=";" |

Scoring statistics

Goaltending statistics

Rankings

USCHO did not release a poll in weeks 1 and 13.

References

External links

2022-23
Minnesota
Minnesota
Minnesota
Minnesota